Montague Airport may refer to:

 Montague Airport (California) in Montague, California, United States (FAA: 1O5)
 Smiths Falls-Montague Airport in Smiths Falls, Ontario, Canada (IATA: YSH)

Other airports in places named Montague:

 Siskiyou County Airport in Montague, California, United States (FAA: SIY)
 Turners Falls Airport in Montague, Massachusetts, United States (FAA: 0B5)